Geltingia is a fungal genus in the family Helicogoniaceae. It is monotypic, containing the single  lichenicolous species Geltingia associata. The genus was circumscribed in 1990 by mycologists Vagn Alstrup and David Leslie Hawksworth. The genus name honours Danish scientist Paul Gelting.

It has a circumpolar distribution. It is known to grow on the lichens Ochrolechia frigida and Ochrolechia upsaliensis.

References

Leotiomycetes
Leotiomycetes genera
Taxa described in 1990
Taxa named by David Leslie Hawksworth